Eurocopter Écureuil may refer to one of three related helicopter designs, each of which was originally manufactured by Aérospatiale (later part of Eurocopter Group, now Airbus Helicopters).

 Eurocopter AS350 Écureuil helicopter
 Eurocopter AS355 Écureuil 2 helicopter
 Eurocopter EC130 Écureuil helicopter